The Walking Dead: Saints & Sinners is a virtual reality first-person shooter survival horror game for Windows, PlayStation 4, Oculus Quest, Oculus Quest 2, and Oculus Rift, developed by Skydance Interactive in partnership with Skybound Entertainment. It is based on the comic book series The Walking Dead by Robert Kirkman. Initially released on Steam and Oculus platform on January 23, 2020, it was released on PlayStation VR in May 2020. It was released on Oculus Quest in October 2020. It's also released on PICO 4 in January 2023.

Gameplay
The player can kill walkers by "braining" them, stabbing them through the skull, puncturing the brain. The player is able to scale buildings to ambush enemies and attack from a distance with throwing weapons, bows, and long-range firearms. Physics-based combat control how melee weapons are controlled. There is a timer on the game called The Bells where after a certain time, the tower rings the bells to "Stir the Herd". Once the bells are rung, a horde is spawned in and chases after the player. 

There is a linear crafting system at the home base, where the player must scavenge different items and salvage them to make new items or weapons. Crafting recipes are unlocked by either upgrading crafting stations or finding them in safes or random drops. There is a random event in each location that an Exile will appear, who will either ask the player for supplies in exchange for materials, or hold the player at gunpoint demanding for supplies. There are four types of zombies, or walkers. The first is a regular walker that is spawned in naturally. The second is spawned from when a regular human is killed without "braining" them. The walked that is spawned in replicates the human that is killed, replicating cut off limbs, helmets, armor, and looks. The third is a special "infected" walker which, when stabbed using melee weapons, will bring down the player's max health. The fourth walker is an "elite walker". These walkers are usually seen wearing helmets and body armor, and are more difficult to kill due to their helmets blocking braining attempts. Weapons can have different weights that effect how the weapon is held. Occasionally, there will be territories claimed by either the Tower, or the Reclaimed.

An alternate game mode is available on all existing platforms is called The Trial. In the game mode the player must kill zombies to earn "bitecoin" which can be spent unlocking more supplies. "The Trial" can be played on three maps, with two difficulties. Hanging zombies can appear within the maps, and can be shot or stabbed for a double bonus boost, where shooting it gives a food which when eaten, gives the player infinite ammo and weapon durability, and using a melee weapon will get a food that, like the previous boost, gives them infinite weapon durability with infinite stamina.

A gamemode called "Aftershocks" released on September 23, 2021 as a free update. It takes place after the main story of the game. It is designed to add new end-game content to the experience including new missions, story elements, and threats. The player will be sent to supply caches to bring back to the base.

Plot 
The game is set in New Orleans after the walker outbreak. The player is taking the role of the Tourist, who is either male or female depending on the player's choice. At a campfire, Henri tells the player the legend of The Reserve, an old military bunker filled with supplies and weapons. Henri explains that there are two factions attempting to take control of New Orleans, the Reclaimed and the Tower.

While in a boat, the Tourist gets swarmed by walkers hiding in the water and crashes onto a cemetery. After navigating through the cemetery, the Tourist finds Henri strung upside down and close to death. The player can either talk to him and find out what happened and then mercy kill him or let him die. After Henri is dead, the player finds a broken down bus made into a survival shelter where Henri was doing his research. In the bus the player finds some food, old military codes, and a broken radio, which Henri was trying to repair. The player already has an automotive battery and an antenna, but is still in need of a microphone. The player must head out to the first location on the map to salvage the sought after item. After installing it, the player makes contact with Casey, who is trapped in the reserve due to a flooding of the bunker. The player agrees to help Casey get out of the Reserve in return of the valuable items inside it. Whilst talking to Casey, the conversation gets interrupted by a lantern lighting up on the graveyard. After further investigation by the player, a coffin  is found where a mysterious person has been gathering intel from the Tower. After finding the intel and putting it in the coffin, the unknown person asks the player to meet them in front of the church courtyard. The unknown person is revealed to be May Benoit, who is a wanted traitor of the Tower. She asks the player to gather Tower intel for her in order to help her and her group of protégés. After getting all of the intel, May gives the player the Reserve key. (May can be killed to skip her entire story line and get the key immediately). Casey wants the player to find and install pumping systems to pump out the water in the Reserve. After finding the first two, the player travels to one of the locations (The Bastion) and meets JB, the leader of The Reclaimed, who gives the player the water pump after talking as well as the code to control the water pumps, telling the player to flood all of the reserve, as it would be better for everyone. After leaving the building that JB is in, the player is stopped by Georgia, The second-in-command of The Tower and niece of Mama, the leader of The Tower, who tells the player to kill JB and they will forgive the player for all that happened. The player can either tell JB that The Tower is right outside the door and fight alongside him or kill JB in favor of the Tower. The player returns to the graveyard and installs the last pump which lights up the entire Reserve, showing everyone where it is.

The player scrambles to hurry to the church to get to the Reserve, where a huge battle breaks out. If the player chose to kill JB, the Tower people will not attack the player, if not though, the Tower will attack the player but they will be ignored by The Reclaimed. During the battle, the player sneaks into the church and finds the control room where they are informed by Casey that something has gone wrong and that the player has to flood a room to save him. The player can either flood the communication room where Casey is trapped in, killing him, flood the armory where the weapons and supplies are stored, or flood everything. If the player floods the Armory, Casey will come out in the church. If May is still alive by that point of the game, she is tugging on a rope of the church bell to send the horde after the factions that are fighting. The player can either choose to kill May, or let May pull the bells and kill everyone. After deciding, the player heads down into the Reserve, gathers whatever supplies are left from either the communication room or the armory, and leaves on a boat.

Reception 

The game has received generally favorable reviews from critics according to review aggregator Metacritic. IGN, giving the game a 9 out of 10, described the game as a fantastic example of what VR can be, while Destructoid wrote that the game is one of the leading VR experiences to date and gave the game a 7.5 out of 10.

It was nominated for Best VR/AR at The Game Awards 2020.

Sequel
A sequel, titled The Walking Dead: Saints & Sinners – Chapter 2: Retribution, was released for Meta Quest 2 in December 1, 2022, and is set to be released for PlayStation VR and PlayStation VR2 in 2023.

References

External links 
Official website

2020 video games
First-person shooters
PlayStation 4 games
PlayStation VR games
Meta Quest games
Oculus Rift games
Survival horror video games
Single-player video games
Skydance Media games
Skydance Interactive games
Unreal Engine games
Video games developed in the United States
Video games featuring protagonists of selectable gender
Video games set in New Orleans
Virtual reality games
Video games about zombies
The Walking Dead video games
Windows games